The Departure Rocks are a group of 4 steep-sided rocks lying  north of Peake-Jones Rock in Holme Bay, Mac. Robertson Land. They were mapped by Norwegian cartographers from air photos taken by the Lars Christensen Expedition, 1936–37, and were so named by the Antarctic Names Committee of Australia because Australian National Antarctic Research Expeditions parties going west from Mawson Station on the sea ice always pass through or close to these rocks.

References

Rock formations of Mac. Robertson Land